Mocquerysiella is a moth genus of the family Depressariidae.

Species
 Mocquerysiella albicosta Viette, 1954
 Mocquerysiella bourginella Viette, 1954

References

Stenomatinae